Sabeeka Imam is a British-Pakistani actress and model. She has established a career in modeling and ramp the walk for several designers. Imam appeared in a comedy-drama film Queen in 2014. She went on to play the romantic interest of the lead male character in the commercially successful Urdu action films Jalaibee (2016) and Sherdil (2019).

Personal life 
Imam was born to Pakistani parents in London. In 2018, she started dating Hasnain Lehri. Both Lehri and Imam ended their relationship in 2020 to which Imam said, "It has a long time since we both realized that our paths are destined to be separate".

Filmography

Awards and nominations

References

External links

21st-century Pakistani actresses
Year of birth missing (living people)
Living people
Pakistani female models